Thongchai Jaidee (born 8 November 1969) is a Thai professional golfer who plays on the PGA Tour Champions. He formerly played on the Asian Tour and the European Tour. On the Asian Tour, he holds the record for the most career earnings and is second in victories having won 13 times. He has won the Order of Merit on the Asian Tour three times during his career. Jaidee was the first man to win US$2 million, US$3 million, US$4 million, and US$5 million on the Asian Tour in prize money.

Early life
Jaidee did not start playing golf until he was sixteen, and he later went into the Royal Thai Army where he was a paratrooper in special forces.

Professional career
Jaidee did not turn professional until he was thirty years old, but he soon achieved success on the Asian Tour, winning the Asian Tour Order of Merit in 2001 and 2004. He first played in a major championship in the 2001 U.S. Open and finished tied 74th. In February 2004 he became the first Thai to win a tournament on the European Tour by winning the Carlsberg Malaysian Open, an event which was co-sanctioned with the Asian Tour. In 2005 he successfully defended his Malaysian Open title.

In 2006 he received a special invitation to play in the Masters Tournament. He was the second Thai to play in the Masters after Sukree Onsham, who did so in 1970 and 1971, and by doing so, he became the first Thai to play in all four major championships.

After his victory in the Volvo Masters of Asia in 2006 he reached 75 in the Official World Golf Rankings. His best year-end ranking on the European Order of Merit has been 9th in 2013. He topped the Asian Tour order of merit for a third time in 2009.

Jaidee won for the fifth time on the European Tour in June 2012 at the ISPS Handa Wales Open. This was the first occasion that Jaidee had won on the European Tour outside Asia. He shot a final round one over 72, but won by a single stroke from four other players.

Jaidee qualified for the 2015 Presidents Cup squad for the first time and in doing so became the first player from Thailand to earn the honor. He won 1.5 points from 3 matches.

In September 2015, Jaidee won his seventh European Tour title at the Porsche European Open in Germany by a single stroke over Englishman Graeme Storm. Jaidee held the 54-hole lead by a stroke and shot a 67 in the final round to claim victory.

Jaidee claimed his eighth European Tour victory in July 2016, with a four-stroke victory at the Open de France. He shot weekend rounds of 68-68, which included a run of 39 holes without a bogey and moved him clear of the chasing pack. Jaidee became the oldest winner of the tournament, at the age of 46, since it became part of the European Tour in 1972.

Amateur wins
1995 Pakistan Amateur Open Championship
1997 Putra Cup
1998 Putra Cup, Singapore Amateur Open Championship, Thailand Amateur Open Championship

Professional wins (21)

European Tour wins (8)

1Co-sanctioned by the Asian Tour
2Co-sanctioned by the Korean Tour

European Tour playoff record (2–0)

Asian Tour wins (13)

1Co-sanctioned by the Korean Tour
2Co-sanctioned by the European Tour

Asian Tour playoff record (3–0)

Other wins (3)
2000 Singha Bangkok Open (Thailand)
2001 Singha Bangkok Open (Thailand)
2019 GolfSixes Cascais (with Phachara Khongwatmai)

PGA Tour Champions wins (1)

Results in major championships

CUT = missed the half-way cut
WD = Withdrew
"T" = tied

Summary

Most consecutive cuts made – 4 (2016 Masters – 2017 Open Championship)
Longest streak of top-10s – 0

Results in The Players Championship

CUT = missed the halfway cut

Results in World Golf Championships
Results not in chronological order prior to 2015.

WD = Withdrew
QF, R16, R32, R64 = Round in which player lost in match play
"T" = Tied
Note that the HSBC Champions did not become a WGC event until 2009.

Results in senior major championships

WD = withdrew
"T" indicates a tie for a place

Team appearances
Dynasty Cup (representing Asia): 2003 (winners), 2005 (winners)
Royal Trophy (representing Asia): 2006, 2007, 2009 (winners), 2010, 2011, 2013
World Cup (representing Thailand): 2007, 2008, 2009, 2011, 2016
EurAsia Cup (representing Asia): 2014 (playing captain), 2016
Presidents Cup (representing the International team): 2015
Amata Friendship Cup (representing Thailand): 2018 (winners)

See also
List of golfers with most Asian Tour wins
List of golfers with most European Tour wins

References

External links

Thongchai Jaidee
Asian Tour golfers
European Tour golfers
PGA Tour Champions golfers
Thongchai Jaidee
Golfers at the 2016 Summer Olympics
Thongchai Jaidee
1969 births
Living people